Damias postnigra is a moth of the family Erebidae first described by Walter Rothschild in 1912. It is found in New Guinea.

References

Damias
Moths described in 1912